Mesciniodes is a monotypic snout moth genus described by George Hampson in 1901. Its only species, Mesciniodes subinfractalis, was described by the same author in the same year. It is found on Celebes and Borneo.

References

Moths described in 1901
Phycitinae
Monotypic moth genera
Moths of Asia
Taxa named by George Hampson
Pyralidae genera